The Venomous is the seventh full-length studio album by the Greek/Swedish melodic death metal band, Nightrage. It was released by Despotz on 31 March 2017, format CD/LP/digital. The album was recorded by Terry Nikas at Zero Gravity studios in Athens, Greece, and mixed and mastered by Lawrence Mackrory at Maskinrummet studio in Uppsala, Sweden.

The Venomous was also released in Japan by record label Avalon/Marquee. The Bonus Track for Japanese release is an alternative version of the instrumental song "Denial of the Soul".

Cover art/layout is made by Vagelis Petiklas of Revolver Design.

Track listing

Videography
Music videos were filmed for two of the album's tracks, "The Venomous" and "Affliction". Both videos were directed by Rawrec productions.

Credits

Band members
Ronnie Nyman − vocals
Marios Iliopoulos − guitars
Magnus Söderman − guitars
Anders Hammer - bass
Lawrence Dinamarca − drums

Guest musicians
Lawrence Mackrory - Additional vocals on "Affliction" and "The Blood".
Peter Sundström - String/keys arrangements on "Denial of The Soul"

References

External links
 

Nightrage albums
2017 albums